Radio Sana is a Bosnian local public radio station, broadcasting from Sanski Most, Bosnia and Herzegovina.

History
Until 1992, Radio Sanski Most operated as part of local/municipal Radio Sarajevo network affiliate. During the Bosnian War, 
on April 19, 1992, units of the Serbian Democratic Party (SDS) and paramilitary forces stormed the radio premises and took power, after which all Bosniak and Croat journalists were fired. Radio station was used for propaganda. Sanski Most was controlled by the Army of Republika Srpska (Bosnian Serbs) and remained under its control until October 1995 when the Army of Bosnia and Herzegovina took over it during Operation Sana shortly before the end of the war. During the withdrawal from Sanski Most, Serb forces blew up the building that housed the radio station and much of the archival documentation. After the liberation of the city, a new municipal radio station was established under its current name, Radio Sana.

Program is mainly produced in Bosnian language at one FM frequency (Sanski Most ) and it broadcasts a variety of programs such as local news, talk shows and music. Local public cable television channel RTV Sana is also part of public municipality services.

Estimated number of potential listeners of Radio Sana is around 168.284.

Due to the geographical position in Bosanska Krajina area, this radiostation is also available in municipalities: 
Bihać, Cazin, Prijedor, Bužim, Bosanski Novi and in neighboring Croatia.

Frequencies
 Sanski Most

See also 
List of radio stations in Bosnia and Herzegovina
Radio Bosanska Krupa
Radio Bosanski Petrovac

References

External links 
 Radio Sana page on Facebook
 www.sanartv.ba
 Communications Regulatory Agency of Bosnia and Herzegovina

External links 
 www.fmscan.org
 www.radiostanica.ba
 Communications Regulatory Agency of Bosnia and Herzegovina

Sanski Most
Radio stations established in 1995
Sanski Most